Koněprusy is a municipality and village in Beroun District in the Central Bohemian Region of the Czech Republic. It has about 200 inhabitants.

Administrative parts
The village of Bítov is an administrative part of Koněprusy.

Sights
Koněprusy is known for the Koněprusy Caves.

References

Villages in the Beroun District